A set or group in card games is a scoring combination consisting of three or more playing cards of the same rank; in some games, such as Bieten, a set may also comprise just two cards (a 'pair').

Description 
Sets are one of the two types of meld that may be used in games where melding is part of the play; the other being a run or sequence. A set or group comprises 3 or 4 cards of the same rank and, usually, different suits. A prial, pair royal, gleek or triplet is a set of 3 cards of equal rank and a quartet or, in some older games, a mournival, is one of four cards of the same rank.

Usually a pair (2 cards of the same rank but different suits) is not counted as a "set"; but some games, such as Bieten or Perlaggen do include pairs as sets. A wild set is one containing wild cards – that is, those cards designated in the rules as being wild, for example, the jokers in Rommé. On the other hand, a natural set is one consisting entirely of 'natural cards'.

Examples

French suited cards

German suited cards

See also
Run (cards)
Straight (poker)

References

Bibliography 
 Parlett, David. The Penguin Book of Card Games. London: Penguin (2008). .

Card game terminology